Bashirabad (also Romanized as Bashīrābād) is a village in Khalili Rural District, in the Central District of Gerash County, Fars Province, Iran. At the 2016 census, its population was 159, in 41 families.

References 

Populated places in Gerash County